Patriarch John VII may refer to:

 John VII of Constantinople, Ecumenical Patriarch in 837–843
 John VII of Jerusalem, Patriarch of Jerusalem in 964–966
 Patriarch John VII of Antioch, a designation contended among various people; see John of Antioch
 John VII, various Maronite Patriarch (designation contended among various people)